Esporte Clube Bahia, known familiarly as Bahia, is a Brazilian professional football club, based in Salvador, capital city of the Brazilian state of Bahia. They play in the Campeonato Baiano, Bahia's state league, and the Campeonato Brasileiro Série A, Brazil's first-tier league.

Bahia has won the Brasileirão title twice: in the 1959 season, defeating the Santos' Santásticos which contained figures such as Gilmar, Mauro, Mengálvio, Coutinho, Pepe and Pelé, in the finals and in the 1988 season Bahia edged Internacional. Bahia has only appeared in the Copa Libertadores three times, reaching the quarterfinals in 1989, Bahia's best-ever performance. The club has also won their state title a record 49 times.

The 2000s have seen the club win only four state titles. Bahia was demoted to the Série B in 2003 and demoted, for the first time ever, to the Série C in 2005, spending two seasons at the bottom of the Brazilian league system. In 2007, they were promoted back to the second level, and in 2010 the club found itself back in the Série A, after eight seasons. Bahia had played its home games with 66,080 people capacity Estádio Fonte Nova since 1951 but after a section of the stadium collapsed in 2007, the Tricolor played at the Estádio de Pituaçu. With the reopening of the Fonte Nova stadium in 2013 as the Arena Fonte Nova, a modern arena built for the 2014 FIFA World Cup, Bahia resumed playing its matches there. The club's home uniform consists of white shirts with blue shorts and red socks. It has a long-standing rivalry with the Vitória and matches between the two sides are known as Ba–Vi.
Players

In December 2022, it was announced that City Football Group had bought majority stake of the club. The acquisition is expected to close in mid-2023.

History

Early years and the first national title

The Esporte Clube Bahia was founded in 1931 when players from two clubs decided to merge. The Associação Atlética da Bahia and the Clube Bahiano de Tênis had decided to discontinue their football divisions. A few years later Bahia became the most popular team in the Northeast of Brazil.

In the club's first year, Bahia won the Torneio Inicio and Bahia State Championship. The first Bahia president was Waldemar Costa, a doctor. Bahia's crest is based on Corinthians'. Bahia's state flag, created by Raimundo Magalhães, was used in place of the São Paulo state flag.

The team was founded with the motto "Nasceu para Vencer" (Born to Win). Bahia won 44 State Championships, 18 more than the Vitória (their rival club), and was the first club to participate in Taça Libertadores da America in 1960.

Between 1959 and 1963, and in 1968, the club represented the state of Bahia in Taça Brasil (the precursor of the Brazilian Championship), winning the title in 1959 and finishing as runner-up in 1961 and 1963.

The 1980s and the second national title
The 1980s were the best in Bahia's history. Bahia won their second national title in 1988, finishing 5th in 1986 and 4th in 1990.

In 1989, Bahia won its second Brazilian Championship against the Internacional from Porto Alegre Bahia won the first leg in Salvador by 2–1. The second leg ended in an 0–0 tie-in Porto Alegre at the Beira Rio Stadium. After these results, Bahia won the Brasileirão, their second national title. The championship gave Bahia the right to play Copa Libertadores for the third time. It was a shock for the southern press  because Salvador is in the Northeast and the victory was over the Internacional, a team from southern Brazil, the region that has the highest Human Development Index in the country.

Dark years
In 1997, Bahia was relegated to the Série B for the first time in its history after a 0–0 draw against the Juventude at the Fonte Nova stadium. In 1999 Bahia was close to being promoted to the Série A again. Bahia had a very good season but finished in 3rd place, which was not enough to see them promoted.

In 2000, due to bribery scandals involving clubs such as the São Paulo and the Internacional, the team returned to the Brazilian First Division, invited by the Clube dos 13, along with the Fluminense, which was made a scapegoat for the controversy and was nationally victimized by the media (see Copa João Havelange).

In 2002 the bank that had sponsored the team went bankrupt and the Bahia began a descent down the Brazilian football pyramid. After the title of the Northeast Cup in 2001 and 2002, Bahia performed poorly in 2003 and was relegated to the Série B for the second time in the club's history. In 2004, the team was close to getting promoted to the Série A again, finishing 4th. In order to be promoted, Bahia would have to win the final match against the Brasiliense, but the referee Paulo César de Oliveira was assigned to that match and many people  say he was all but fair on that day. In 2005, the club again competed in the Série B, finishing in 18th place, and was relegated to the Série C for the first time in the club's history.

Fênix tricolor (tricolored phoenix)
Bahia finished 2007 among the first four teams of the Third Division and was promoted to the Second Division for the 2008 season. The Bahia began strongly, but in the last game of the 3rd stage of the Série C against the already-eliminated Fast Club, Bahia needed a win to advance to the final. The victory came in the last minute of the game with a goal scored by Charles. In the final, the team finished the third division in 2nd place, only losing the title in the final round. This moment is called the "Fênix Tricolor" amongst Bahia fans. The phoenix represents Bahia rising from the ashes.

Despite playing in the Third Division of Brazilian football in 2007, Bahia had the largest average attendance in Brazil: 40,400 people per match. No club in the Third, the Second, or even the First Division was able to match it. However, this is not unusual for Bahia, having also achieved the biggest average attendance in Brazil in 2004 (Second Division), 1988 (First Division), 1986 (First Division), and 1985 (First Division).

Recent years
From 2010 to 2014 Bahia remained in the first division. In 2013, a fan takeover lead the club to pursue more left-wing and socially engaged politics, focusing on racism, LGBTQ rights, the demarcation of indigenous lands and the treatment of female fans in football stadiums. At the same time, they have managed to reduce ticket prices, increase revenues, pay off some of the debt that was crippling the club and improve their results on the pitch.

In 2014 they were relegated to the second division again but came back in 2016. In 2017 they are playing in the first division. After 22 years out of international competition, Bahia returned in 2012 when they qualified for the Copa Sul-Americana. In addition, they won the 2012, 2014, and 2015 Bahia State Championship and the Northeast Cup in 2017.

In February 2018 the intense rivalry between Bahia and Esporte Clube Vitória drew international attention when ten players (five from each team) were shown the red card in a State Championship match.

Symbols
Bahia's colors are blue, red, and white. The blue color pays homage to the Associação Atlética da Bahia; white, to the Clube Baiano de Tênis; and red for the Bahia state flag. The club's mascot is called Super-Homem Tricolor (Tricolor Superman) and was inspired by the DC Comics character. The mascot was created by the famous cartoonist Ziraldo based on the expression  "Esquadrão de Aço" (Steel Squad) and wears a costume very similar to the original Superman's costume, which shares the team's colors.

Stadium
Bahia played at the Fonte Nova stadium from its inauguration in 1951 until November 2007.
During the game against the Vila Nova (during Bahia's promotion campaign) a part of the stadium collapsed. Seven people died and more than 30 were injured.

After that episode, the state government declared that the stadium would be demolished. A new stadium was built on the site for the 2014 FIFA World Cup.

Some notable games at the Fonte Nova:

Bahia : Internacional 2–1 (Série A – Final – 1988)
Bahia : Fluminense 2–1 (Série A – Semi-finals – 1988)
Bahia : Flamengo 4–1 (Série A – 2000)
Bahia : Sport Recife 3–1 (Northeast Cup – Final – 2001)
Bahia : Fast Club 1–0 (Série C – 3rd Stage – 2007)

In April, the Bahia was back to the Arena Fonte Nova

League record

National league

 
Association football clubs established in 1931
Bahia
Sport in Salvador, Bahia
1931 establishments in Brazil
Campeonato Brasileiro Série A winning clubs
Announced mergers and acquisitions